The University of Oregon Athletic Department has existed in its current hierarchical state with a Director of Athletics at the top of the department and assistant and associate directors serving as subordinates since 1947. In that time there have been twelve Directors of Athletics. Three former head football coaches, Len Casanova, Rich Brooks and Mike Bellotti have gone on to serve as Director of Athletics at some point after their coaching careers. The current Director of Athletics is Rob Mullens, he has held his post since July 15, 2010.

Athletic directors

References 

Oregon Ducks athletic directors